Eric Fromm (born June 27, 1958) is a former professional tennis player from the United States.

Tennis career
Fromm's best result at a Grand Slam was reaching the fourth round of the French Open in 1983 in singles, where he lost in straight sets to world No. 1 in the world Jimmy Connors and the semifinals of the 1984 French Open doubles with Shlomo Glickstein of Israel, where they lost in five sets to Yannick Noah and Henri Leconte. Fromm's career highlights include a top 50 ranking in singles and top 30 ranking in doubles as well as wins over Yannick Noah at Wimbledon and Pat Cash at the US Open. He retired from the pro tour in 1986 and was inducted into the Eastern Tennis Hall of Fame in 2016.

After pro tennis
Fromm completed his undergraduate degree at Columbia University and earned an MBA from Columbia Business School. He joined SPORTIME in 2002 as managing partner of SPORTIME Harbor Island in Mamaroneck, New York and was promoted to the executive management team of SPORTIME in 2007. He became general manager and director of Tennis of the historic Orange Lawn Tennis Club in 2018.

Fromm raised his family in Chappaqua, New York with his wife Lori. Fromm has three children, a son Daniel, and two daughters, Carly and Alana. Fromm and his wife reside in New Rochelle, New York.

Career finals

Singles (1 runner-up)

Doubles (9 runner-ups)

References

External links
 
 

1958 births
Living people
American male tennis players
Delaware Fightin' Blue Hens men's tennis players
Columbia College (New York) alumni
Sportspeople from Queens, New York
People from Chappaqua, New York

Tennis people from New York (state)
Columbia Business School alumni